Maria Costanza "Mimma" Moroni (born 29 September 1969) is a former Italian high jumper, long jumper and triple jumper.

Career
She finished eighth at the 1988 World Junior Championships, eleventh at the 1997 Summer Universiade, and ninth at the 1997 Mediterranean Games. She also competed at the 1998 European Championships without reaching the final.

Moroni became Italian champion in 1998, and Italian indoor champion in 1997. Her personal best jump was 14.25 metres, achieved in July 1998 in Formia. She also had 6.47 metres in the long jump and 1.82 metres in the high jump, both achieved in 1998 too.

Achievements
Senior

Masters

See also
 Italian all-time lists - Triple jump
 List of Italian records in masters athletics

References

External links
 

1969 births
Living people
Italian female long jumpers
Italian female triple jumpers
Italian female high jumpers
Italian masters athletes
Athletes (track and field) at the 1997 Mediterranean Games
Mediterranean Games competitors for Italy
Sportspeople from Turin
20th-century Italian women